The term Oriental Orthodox Patriarch may refer to any of several patriarchs of the Oriental Orthodox Church:

 Armenian Orthodox Patriarch
 Coptic Orthodox Patriarch
 Ethiopian Orthodox Patriarch
 Syriac Orthodox Patriarch (disambiguation)

See also
 Eastern Orthodox Patriarch (disambiguation)